The Biblioteca Queriniana is a public library with a rich collection of ancient manuscripts, located on Via Giuseppe Mazzini in Brescia, region of Lombardy, Italy. The library was founded in 1747 and owes the nucleus of its collection to Cardinal Angelo Maria Querini (1680–1755).

History
The library was founded by the cardinal, who commissioned the architect Antonio Marchetti to design a building to house the institution. The library was sited at the archbishop's palace. In 1797, the library was nationalized by the Napoleonic government and came under the ownership of the commune.

Over the centuries, the collection has increased, with the addition of libraries from suppressed Catholic monasteries and churches and the donations of private individuals. Eighteenth-century Italy had a number of examples of public libraries endowed by Catholic church leaders, including the Biblioteca Forteguerriana and Fabroniana of Pistoia and the Biblioteca Marucelliana of Florence.

Among notable manuscripts in its collection are:
Codex Brixianus (Evangelario purpureo) (6th century)
Concordance of the Gospels by Eusebius (11th century)
Fragments of a text by San Cipriano (5th century) 
English Psalter (14th century)
Greek Gospel (10th century)
Pages of the Koran (15th century)
Divine Comedy, edition by Bonini with woodcuts 
Illuminated first edition of the Canzoniere of Petrarch

The library possesses over 526,000 volumes, of which 130,000 were published before 1830.

References

Bibliography 
 

Infrastructure completed in 1747
Queriniana, Brescia
Baroque architecture in Brescia
Libraries established in 1747